Eitan Tayeb is a former Israeli footballer who played for Hapoel Beit She'an F.C. Tayeb now works as a manager.

He is of a Tunisian-Jewish descent.

References

External links
 
 

1971 births
Living people
Israeli footballers
Hapoel Beit She'an F.C. players
Maccabi Haifa F.C. players
Maccabi Netanya F.C. players
Maccabi Ahi Nazareth F.C. players
Liga Leumit players
Footballers from Beit She'an
Israeli people of Tunisian-Jewish descent
Hapoel Beit She'an F.C. managers
Hapoel Midgal HaEmek F.C. managers
Association football central defenders
Israeli football managers